BostonNOW is a discontinued free daily newspaper that was distributed in Boston, combining both traditional and web journalism.

BostonNOW offered information in print, online and mobile. The newspaper was targeted towards commuters rather than residences; it was widely distributed at key MBTA subway stations. The tabloid held daily polls, contests, and a "Treasure Hunt" contest, and relied heavily on bloggers for content.

The newspaper's main competition was the similarly distributed Boston Metro.

BostonNOW began publication on April 17, 2007. On April 14, 2008, the publishers announced that it was shutting down, effective immediately, due to financial reversals by its Iceland-based funders.  Russel Pergament, BostonNOW's CEO, said in a release, "Our overseas investors are honorable people who have endeavored to fulfill all obligations to this newspaper but the tumult in foreign credit markets has forced a change in our original understanding and their focus now appears to be primarily upon their core retail holdings." 

Publications established in 2007
Publications disestablished in 2008
Newspapers published in Boston